Macoya is a small town located alongside the Churchill-Roosevelt Highway in Trinidad and Tobago.  It is located between Tunapuna and Trincity on the island of Trinidad.

It is composed primarily of:
Macoya/Trincity industrial estate - commercial warehouses 
Macoya Gardens - a small residential neighbourhood.
Macoya village - located around 
Macoya Road near Constantine park
Macoya extension - a developing community, south bound of centre of excellence.
The Marvin Lee Stadium, a football facility that hosts domestic and international football matches as well as the adjacent João Havelange Centre of Excellence are located in Macoya.

References

Populated places in Trinidad and Tobago